Darya Stezhko (born 17 February 1998) is a Belarusian footballer who plays as a forward for Premier League club FC Dinamo Minsk and the Belarus women's national team.

References

1998 births
Living people
Women's association football forwards
Belarusian women's footballers
Footballers from Minsk
Belarus women's international footballers